HP OpenView Storage Area Manager (OVSAM) is a Hewlett Packard software suite for management of storage resources and infrastructure.

HP OpenView Storage Area Manager provides comprehensive, centralized management across distributed, heterogeneous storage networks. The HP OpenView Storage Area Manager suite includes the following applications that share a common core services, GUI, host agent, and repository: 
Storage Node Manager (Device Management, Health/Status),
Storage Optimizer (Performance),
Storage Builder (Capacity),
Storage Accountant (Chargeback/Metering),
Storage Allocator (LUN Access Control)

HP Storage Essentials Enterprise Edition has effectively replaced HP OpenView Storage Area Manager in the HP Storage Management Software portfolio.

Major Releases 
 HP OpenView Storage Area Manager 3.2, July 2004
 HP OpenView Storage Area Manager 3.1
 HP OpenView Storage Area Manager 3.0
 HP OpenView Storage Area Manager 2.2, February 2002

Current Release 
 SANMGR_00017 Patch (aka HP OVSAM v3.2.5), December 2005

External Product Links
 HP OpenView Storage Area Manager (OVSAM) QuickSpecs
 HP OpenView Storage Area Manager (OVSAM) Device Plug-Ins (DPI) Download
 HP OVSAM Software Patches - passport login required
 HP Product Manuals Search Page - Select "Storage Area Manager"

Related Product External Links
 HP Systems Insight Manager
 HP Storage Essentials Software
 HP Storage Essentials Enterprise Edition

See also
 List of SAN Network Management Systems

OpenView Storage Area Manager